The 1945–46 season in Swedish football, starting August 1945 and ending July 1946:

Honours

Official titles

Competitions

Promotions, relegations and qualifications

Promotions

League transfers

Relegations

Domestic results

Allsvenskan 1945–46

Allsvenskan promotion play-off 1945–46

Division 2 Norra 1945–46

Division 2 Östra 1945–46

Division 2 Västra 1945–46

Division 2 Södra 1945–46

Division 2 promotion play-off 1945–46 
1st round

2nd round

Svenska Cupen 1945 
Final

National team results 

 Sweden: 

 Sweden: 

 Sweden: 

 Sweden: 

 Sweden: 

 Sweden: 

 Sweden:

National team players in season 1945/46

Notes

References 
Print

Online

 
Seasons in Swedish football